The 1000 metres distance for women in the 2009–10 ISU Speed Skating World Cup was contested over seven races on six occasions, out of a total of seven World Cup occasions for the season, with the first occasion taking place in Berlin, Germany, on 6–8 November 2009, and the final occasion taking place in Heerenveen, Netherlands, on 12–14 March 2010.

Christine Nesbitt of Canada defended her title from the previous season, while Margot Boer of the Netherlands came second, and Monique Angermüller of Germany came third.

Top three

Race medallists

Final standings
Standings as of 14 March 2010 (end of the season).

References

Women 1000
ISU